Eczematolepis is an extinct genus of ptyctodontidan from the Milwaukee Formation of Wisconsin. Three species are known: E. fragilis, E. pustulosus and E. telleri. It was originally classified as the genus Acantholepis but that name was preoccupied.

References

Ptyctodontids
Givetian extinctions
Placoderm genera
Fossil taxa described in 1892